County Prep High School is a full-time public magnet high school for students in ninth through twelfth grades, located in Jersey City in Hudson County, New Jersey, United States, operating as part of the Hudson County Schools of Technology.

As of the 2021–22 school year, the school had an enrollment of 954 students and 91.0 classroom teachers (on an FTE basis), for a student–teacher ratio of 10.5:1. There were 431 students (45.2% of enrollment) eligible for free lunch and 91 (9.5% of students) eligible for reduced-cost lunch.

Awards, recognition and rankings
Schooldigger.com ranked the school tied for 184th out of 381 public high schools statewide in its 2011 rankings (a decrease of 21 positions from the 2010 ranking) which were based on the combined percentage of students classified as proficient or above proficient on the two components of the High School Proficiency Assessment (HSPA), mathematics (81.3%) and language arts literacy (91.0%).

Awards and recognition
The school was one of nine schools in New Jersey, and the only high school, honored in 2020 by the National Blue Ribbon Schools Program, which recognizes high student achievement.

Academics
Academic courses are aligned to the New Jersey Core Curriculum Content Standards. Career clusters include Communications, Medicine and Science, Technological Engineering and Design, Business, and the Arts. Students are involved in the plan and design of their learning path promoting a desire to explore, to be creative, and to succeed.

Program choices ensure that all students participate in internships, work/study programs, and community service before graduation.

Sports
Starting in the 2010-11 school year, County Prep no longer offers sports to their students due to budget cuts. District officials noted that students would remain eligible to compete on behalf of their home school districts.

The 2010 boys' track team became Tri-County Champions defeating McNair Academy and Hoboken High School.

The County Prep Hurricanes girls' tennis team completed its fifth straight Seglio Division season undefeated by beating Marist 5-0 in Bayonne. The Team had won 70 consecutive Seglio Division matches.

The 2007 girls' tennis team won the North II, Group I state sectional championship with a 3-2 win over Glen Ridge High School in the tournament final.

The boys' baseball team won the 2009 North II Group I NJSIAA State Sectional Title, advancing to the Group I tournament where they lost to Park Ridge High School 10–0 in the semi-final round.

Administration
The school's principal is Barbara Mendolla. Her administration team includes the assistant principal.

Alternative schools
County Prep High School also provides alternative schools located in the same building. Career Academy is an alternative High School.  School begins after 3:00 pm and students are provided with dinner. The principal for Career Academy is John Holoduek.

Besides Career Academy, another alternative high school is the Adult High School (AHS). AHS begins at 6:30 pm to 8:30 pm and classes are in session from Monday to Thursday. Students must graduate with at least 110 credits and pass the High School Proficiency Assessment (HSPA) or be SRA. Students can take up to 20 credits per semester and can finish high school in three years.

Course programs towards earning a GED at County Prep High School are offered after 4:00 pm.

References

External links
County Prep High School
Hudson County Schools of Technology

School Data for the Hudson County Schools of Technology, National Center for Education Statistics

Education in Jersey City, New Jersey
Magnet schools in New Jersey
Public high schools in Hudson County, New Jersey